Pyrgotis siderantha is a species of moth of the family Tortricidae. It is found in Sri Lanka.

The wingspan is 12–14 mm. The forewings are ferruginous brown with various scattered small shining bluish-leaden-metallic spots. The hindwings are yellow whitish.

References

Moths described in 1905
Archipini